Marion G. MacDonald (October 1, 1914 – January 18, 1990) was an American football and basketball coach. He served as the head basketball coach at Western Carolina University–then known as Western Carolina Teachers College–from 1945 to 1947 and Washburn University in Topeka, Kansas from 1951 to 1960. During his time at Western Carolina, he also served as an assistant football coach and, for one season, head coach in 1945.

References

External links
 

1914 births
1990 deaths
Basketball coaches from South Dakota
Fort Hays State Tigers men's basketball coaches
Washburn Ichabods men's basketball coaches
Western Carolina Catamounts football coaches
Western Carolina Catamounts men's basketball coaches
People from Sanborn County, South Dakota